The 1941 NCAA Swimming and Diving Championships were contested in March 1941 at Jenison Pool at Michigan State College in East Lansing, Michigan at the fifth annual NCAA-sanctioned swim meet to determine the team and individual national champions of men's collegiate swimming and diving in the United States. 

For the fifth consecutive year, Michigan topped the team standings, edging out Yale for the second straight year. It was the Wolverines' fifth title in program history and the fifth for coach Matt Mann.

Team standings
Note: Top 10 only
(H) = Hosts

See also
List of college swimming and diving teams

References

NCAA Division I Men's Swimming and Diving Championships
NCAA Swimming And Diving Championships
NCAA Swimming And Diving Championships